Neolamprologus marunguensis is a species of cichlid endemic to Lake Tanganyika where it is usually found in the rocky habitat at a depth of between . This species can reach a length of  TL.  This species can also be found in the aquarium trade.

References

Büscher, H.H., 1989. Ein neuer Tanganjika-Cichlide aus Zaire. Neolamprologus marunguensis n. sp. (Cichlidae, Lamprologini). D.A.T.Z. 42(12):739–743.

marunguensis
Taxa named by Heinz Heinrich Büscher
Fish described in 1989
Fish of Lake Tanganyika